The 54th Infantry Division (54.Infanterie-Division) was a division of the Imperial German Army during World War I. The division was formed on March 3, 1915, from units taken from other divisions or newly raised. Its infantry core was from different parts of the German Empire: the 27th Reserve Infantry Regiment from Prussian Saxony, taken from the 7th Reserve Division, the 84th Infantry Regiment from Schleswig-Holstein, taken from the 18th Infantry Division, and the 90th Reserve Infantry Regiment from the Grand Duchy of Mecklenburg-Schwerin, taken from the 18th Reserve Division. Divisional cavalry was a squadron of Brunswick's Death's Head Hussars.

After a brief period on the line in France, the division was sent to the Eastern Front in July 1915. It returned to the Western Front in October 1915. From May to November 1916, the division saw extensive action in the Battle of Verdun, especially in the fight for Fort Douaumont. In 1917, it saw action in the Third Battle of Ypres, suffering heavy losses. It also faced the Allied tank attack in Cambrai in November 1917. It was rated by Allied intelligence in 1917 and 1918 as a second class division, mainly due to heavy losses in the attacks it faced or took part in.

Order of battle on March 3, 1915

The 54th Infantry Division's initial organization when formed in 1915 was as follows:

108.Infanterie-Brigade
Reserve-Infanterie-Regiment Nr. 27
Infanterie-Regiment von Manstein (1. Schleswigsches) Nr. 84
Großherzoglich Mecklenburgisches Reserve-Infanterie-Regiment Nr. 90
Radfahrer-Kompanie Nr. 54
1.Eskadron/Braunschweigisches Husaren-Regiment Nr. 17
54.Feldartillerie-Brigade
Feldartillerie-Regiment Nr. 107
Feldartillerie-Regiment Nr. 108
Fußartillerie-Bataillon Nr. 54
Pionier-Kompanie Nr. 107
Pionier-Kompanie Nr. 108

Late World War I organization

The division underwent comparatively fewer organizational changes during the course of the war than most other divisions. Its artillery, signals and engineers were reorganized as in other divisions. The 54th Infantry Division's order of battle on February 22, 1918, was as follows:

108.Infanterie-Brigade
Reserve-Infanterie-Regiment Nr. 27
Infanterie-Regiment von Manstein (1. Schleswigsches) Nr. 84
Großherzoglich Mecklenburgisches Reserve-Infanterie-Regiment Nr. 90
MG-Scharfschützen-Abteilung Nr. 39
1.Eskadron/Braunschweigisches Husaren-Regiment Nr. 17
Artillerie-Kommandeur 55:
Feldartillerie-Regiment Nr. 108
Fußartillerie-Bataillon Nr. 54 (from 16.04.1918)
Stab Pionier-Bataillon Nr. 138:
Pionier-Kompanie Nr. 107
Pionier-Kompanie Nr. 108
Minenwerfer-Kompanie Nr. 54
Divisions-Nachrichten-Kommandeur 54

References
 54. Infanterie-Division - Der erste Weltkrieg
 Hermann Cron et al., Ruhmeshalle unserer alten Armee (Berlin, 1935)
 Hermann Cron, Geschichte des deutschen Heeres im Weltkriege 1914-1918 (Berlin, 1937)
 Histories of Two Hundred and Fifty-One Divisions of the German Army which Participated in the War (1914-1918), compiled from records of Intelligence section of the General Staff, American Expeditionary Forces, at General Headquarters, Chaumont, France 1919 (1920)

Notes

Military units and formations established in 1915
1915 establishments in Germany
Infantry divisions of Germany in World War I
Military units and formations disestablished in 1919